Alpe d'HuZes is a Dutch fundraising event for combating cancer in which people climb, typically by bike, six times in a single day. The mountain Alpe d'Huez is well-known in the Netherlands as one of the main Tour de France mountains where Dutch cyclists have been traditionally relatively successful. The event is organized by Stichting Alpe d'HuZes, whose name is a combination of the name of the mountain Alpe d'Huez and the Dutch word "zes" (six) and its motto is "opgeven is geen optie" (quitting is not an option).

During the first edition, the number six was central, as it challenged people to climb the mountain six times, on 6/6/2006 with 66 participants. In later years the number of climbs became more fluid, and while some still climb 6 times, others climb once, or more. Teams can consist of any number of people and raise money jointly.

The aim of the event is to raise money for research into cancer. The event runs on volunteers and all costs are borne by the participants themselves.  The mission of Alpe d'HuZes is to raise money for cancer research so that in the future no one has to die from cancer.

Peter Kapitein, cancer survivor, co-founder and participant of the first Alpe d'HuZes event in 2006, received an honorary doctorate from the Free University of Amsterdam in October 2012 for "his exceptional merits for investigating and improving the possibilities of living with cancer."

Alpe d'HuZes/KWF Fonds 
Due to the rapidly increasing collected total amounts by Alpe d'HuZes, the donations through Alpe d'HuZes are managed by the Dutch Cancer Society (KWF) in a dedicated named fund: Alpe d'HuZes/KWF-fonds. This fund pays for research through the KWF grants process with a particular focus on long-term research into successful rehabilitation of cancer patients. This is based on the conclusion that there is a lot of knowledge already in what factors affect getting cancer, but much less about the factors that make patients live more or less well with the disease.

2013 scandals and lower donations 
Short after the 2013 edition, the event and foundation were criticized because they hadn't been able to actually spend 37 million euro of the collected donations from the previous years and researchers complained that the process to get funding was opaque. Later that year Coen van Veenendaal, one of the founders and former member of the board, was accused of making large sums of money from the foundation, both through high reimbursements and working for the company Inspire2Live that was subsidized by the foundation. It turned out that the subsidy of 3 million was only partially spent on scientific research, but mostly on management fees and reimbursement for travel. The board of the company announced to resign and his behavior was condemned by the board of Alpe d'HuZes.

The scandal played out widely in the Dutch media, and one of the most successful fundraising effort was suddenly much less appreciated. In the years after, Alpe d'HuZes and KWF strengthened its checks and balances after they were forced to admit that oversight was insufficient in the case of Inspire2Live and some other subsidies. The collected funds were much lower in the following year (13.5 million) compared to 2013 (29 million) and also the years after, the collected amounts would remain between 10 and 15 million. Also the annual direct donations drive of KWF (not through Alpe d'HuZes) raised about 15% less than usual. This was in part due to the economic crisis, as other charities raised on average 8% less - but the downturn was also attributed to the scandals.

Editions 
Since its first edition in 2006, Alpe d"HuZes has raised more than 150 million euros in the fight against cancer.

References

Notes 

Cancer fundraisers
Non-profit organisations based in the Netherlands